{{Speciesbox
|image = Phalaenopsis cornu-cervi Orchi 14.jpg
|image_caption = Flower of Phalaenopsis cornu-cervi
|genus = Phalaenopsis
|species = cornu-cervi
|authority = (Breda) Blume & Rchb.f.
|synonyms =
Polychilos cornu-cervi Breda (basionym)
Polystylus cornu-cervi (Breda) Hasselt ex Hassk.
Polystylus cornu-cervi var. picta Hassk.
Phalaenopsis de-vriesiana Rchb.f.
Phalaenopsis lamelligera H.R.Sweet
Polychilos lamelligera (H.R.Sweet) Shim
Phalaenopsis thalebanii Seidenf.
Phalaenopsis cornu-cervi var. flava Braem ex Holle-De RaevePhalaenopsis borneensis GarayPhalaenopsis cornu-cervi f. flava (Braem ex Holle-De Raeve) ChristensonPhalaenopsis cornu-cervi f. sanguinea ChristensonPhalaenopsis cornu-cervi f. thalebanii (Seidenf.) ChristensonPhalaenopsis cornu-cervi f. chattaladae D.L.GrovePhalaenopsis cornu-cervi f. borneensis (Garay) O.Gruss & M.WolffPhalaenopsis cornu-cervi f. picta (Hassk.) O.Gruss & M.WolffPhalaenopsis borneensis Garay
|}}Phalaenopsis cornu-cervi is a species of orchid occurring from Indochina to western Malesia and the Philippines.

Taxonomy
It is one of the parent species of the natural hybrid Phalaenopsis × valentinii, as well as the natural hybrid Phalaenopsis × lotubela''.

External links
 
 

cornu-cervi
Orchids of the Philippines